In geometry, the band model is a conformal model of the hyperbolic plane. The band model employs a portion of the Euclidean plane between two parallel lines. Distance is preserved along one line through the middle of the band.

Geodesics include the line along the middle of the band, and any open line segment perpendicular to boundaries of the band connecting the sides of the band. All geodesics have ends with either are orthogonal to the boundaries of the band or which approach . Lines parallel to the boundaries of the band within the band are hypercycles whose centers are the line through the middle of the band.

See also
 Mercator projection

References

External links
 Models of hyperbolic geometry
 Conformal Models of the Hyperbolic Geometry

Conformal geometry
Hyperbolic geometry